Since its debut in 1981, the Indiana Jones franchise has become part of American popular culture. References have been made in television series, movies, music and other material since the original film was released.

Some of the most parodied scenes include:
From Raiders of the Lost Ark, the opening adventure in the Temple of the Chachapoyan Warriors, including seizing the Chachapoyan Fertility Idol and escaping from the different traps, including the rolling boulder trap.
From Raiders of the Lost Ark, the final sequence where the Ark of the Covenant is packed into crate 9906753 and stored in Hangar 51.
From Temple of Doom, the scene where Jones rolls under a closing door and reaches back under to pick up his fedora.

Star Wars

Canon
The Clone Wars:
The Headpiece to the Staff of Ra (the headpiece on Senator Kharrus' staff) and the Ark of the Covenant appear in the first-season episodes "The Gungan General" and "Liberty on Ryloth" respectively, while the Season Three finale "Wookiee Hunt" includes the Crystal Skull of Akator from Indiana Jones and the Kingdom of the Crystal Skull in the Trandoshan trophy room.
The dance sequence in the Season Three episode "Hunt for Ziro" was inspired by the opening scene of Indiana Jones and the Temple of Doom.
Season Four's "Friends and Enemies" sees bounty hunter Cad Bane examining a fedora while looking for a new hat.[3]
In Season Five's fifth episode, "Tipping Points", Hondo Ohnaka's yacht Fortune and Glory, first appears, named in reference to the line from Temple of Doom.
In Season Six's third episode, "Fugitive", droid AZ-3's reaction to Fives taking out a group of clones channels Henry Jones's when his son guns down Nazis at Castle Brunwald: "Look what you did... I can't believe what you did..."
In Season Six story arc "The Disappeared" (by J. W. Rinzler), Peteen's dual role as both High Seneschal and secretive cultist was inspired by Chattar Lal while the script called for the protagonists to ride off "like the end of The Last Crusade."
Rebels:
Much of the structure in the latter half of the second season's half episodes was made with Last Crusade in mind, including "The Honorable Ones", "The Forgotten Droid" and "The Call". The Malachor Sith Temple from the season finale "Twilight of the Apprentice" was designed to be similar to the Temple of the Sun, with several challenges protecting the sought after Sith holocron.
Arihnda Pryce shares Irina Spalko's look.
The Holy Grail can be seen in the episode "Through Imperial Eyes". It was later identified by name in the episode's Rebels Recon behind-the-scenes video.
The Force Awakens: Han Solo is chased through a corridor on his freighter by a spherical rathtar which reuses the sound effect of the Raiders of the Lost Ark rolling boulder.
In the LEGO video game adaptation, Solo retrieves his hair before a door closes down, a nod to the Indiana Jones and the Temple of Doom spike chamber escape. Also, the Ark of the Covenant can be seen in the background when Rey first picks up her lightsaber at Maz Kanata's castle at Takodana.
The Last Jedi: The Master Codebreaker who Finn, Rose Tico and BB-8 search for at the casino in Canto Bight, wears a white tuxedo with red boutonnière, resembling the attire that Indiana Jones wears in the opening sequence of Temple of Doom, as noted by Lucasfilm Ltd. senior content and asset specialist Phil Szostak.
Solo: A Star Wars Story: One of Dryden Vos' Crimson Dawn henchmen is named Toht Ra after both the Gestapo agent Arnold Ernst Toht and the Headpiece to the Staff of Ra he burns his hand on. The Chachapoyan Fertility Idol is also present among Vos' collection.

Legends
Indiana Jones is an unlockable character in LEGO Star Wars: The Complete Saga.
The famous non-canon comic "Into the Great Unknown" features Indiana Jones and Short Round discovering the remains of Han Solo on Earth.
LEGO Star Wars: The Quest for R2-D2 features a cameo by Jones.
LEGO Star Wars: Bombad Bounty depicts Boba Fett trying to cross a Death Star hallway to get to Jar Jar Binks. However, he is stopped by three things: Han Solo chasing a small group of stormtroopers, several more stormtroopers chasing Han Solo, and Indiana Jones running from a boulder. Fett gets run over by the boulder, as he attempts to cross the hallway after Jones has passed through. Additionally, Mola Ram is a patron of the Mos Eisley cantina and Darth Vader sees LEGO Indiana Jones and the Raiders of the Lost Brick on his hospital TV before changing the channel.
Robot Chicken: Star Wars Episode II: The Emperor encourages one of his royal guard to use their "Staff of Ra" in fixing an overhead vent.
LEGO Star Wars III: The Clone Wars: There are three references to Indiana Jones in this game. In the level "The Hidden Enemy", the player must stand on two buttons to reveal Indiana Jones and Henry Jones Sr. tied to a chair behind a bookshelf to collect a special object – a homage to the Castle Brunwald scene in Indiana Jones and the Last Crusade. The second reference is in the level "Ambush". To obtain another special collectible, the player must enter a room similar to the Well of Souls, and find the object inside the Ark of the Covenant by activating it – a reference to Raiders of the Lost Ark. Also, in the bonus mission "Hostage Crisis", the player must activate a screen, and make his/her character jump to make the Indiana Jones on the screen jump as well to complete a small minigame – a strong similarity to the Xbox 360 Kinect and another homage to Indiana Jones.
Return of the Ewok: In this mockumentary short starring Warrick Davis, the poster of Raiders of the Lost Ark can be seen on producer Robert Watts' wall.
Star Wars Detours: The first trailer shows Han Solo trying on Indiana Jones' fedora.

Marvel Cinematic Universe
Captain America: The First Avenger: Red Skull dismisses Adolf Hitler as "digging for trinkets in the desert", a nod to the Nazis' search for the Ark of the Covenant at Tanis. Producer Kevin Feige stated that the film's crew took inspiration from Raiders to make the audience feel the film was a period piece.
Guardians of the Galaxy: The opening scene with Peter Quill obtaining the orb is an homage to the opening scene of Raiders, later on with Quill at one point describing the orb as having an "Ark of the Covenant, Maltese Falcon vibe."
Avengers: Age of Ultron: Brian Tyler's music score for the film pays homage to John Williams' score for Raiders (as well as Star Wars and Superman: The Movie).
Agent Carter: In the episode "Better Angels" a mention is made of a Professor "Abner Brody" who travels to Peru. The name is a portmanteau of two characters from Raiders – the unseen Abner Ravenwood and National Museum curator Marcus Brody.
Avengers: Infinity War: When Ebony Maw attempts to obtain the Time Stone from around Doctor Strange's neck, his palm is severely burned thanks to Strange's protective spell, in a manner similar to how Toht received the imprint of the Headpiece to the Staff of Ra on his hand in Raiders.
Avengers: Endgame: When War Machine and Nebula time travel back to 2014 to obtain the Orb before Star-Lord on Morag, War Machine warns his companion that the Orb's tomb must have skeletons on spikes and traps because it's how many other temples with artifacts are protected, indirectly referencing Raiders.

Film
Borat: The movie parodies the flight map sequence of Indiana Jones
Toy Story: When Buzz is trying to outrun the globe, he is parodying the famous boulder scene in Raiders of the Lost Ark.
Alvin and the Chipmunks: The Squeakquel: The poster of Indiana Jones and the Kingdom of the Crystal Skull is seen.
Back at the Barnyard: The scene with the idol and sandbag from Raiders of the Lost Ark is parodied when Pip the Rat tries to get the cheese off a mouse trap.
Chicken Run: After Ginger and Rocky escape from Mrs. Tweedy's pie machine, she reaches under a closing door to retrieve her hat similar to Indy's way to retrieve his fedora in Indiana Jones and the Temple of Doom.
Condorito: La Película: When Condorito and Coné are at the jungle temple to recover the amulet of hypnosis for Emperor Molusco, they are chased by Condorito's ancestor, who is now a mummy. Immediately, wearing an attire similar to that of Indiana Jones, Condorito gets involved with Coné and the Condor Mummy in a mine cart chase which references Indiana Jones and the Temple of Doom.
Despicable Me 2: When Felonious Gru suspects that Eduardo Perez is actually the supposedly deceased supervillain El Macho, he follows him to his secret lair during his party of Cinco de Mayo, where he finds that to access to the lair, he has to go through a platform that activates the door access code sounds music, very similar to the wall-mounted poison dart launchers chamber of the Temple of the Chachapoyan Warriors from Raiders of the Lost Ark.
Dora and the Lost City of Gold: The film's climax takes inspiration from Indiana Jones and the Last Crusade – upon finding a part of Parapata's treasure, Alejandro Gutierrez fails to open the doors leading to the city's greatest treasure and falls into a deathly trap while Dora Márquez succeeds on opening it, to which Princess Kawillaka assures her that she chose wisely, much like when the Grail Knight congrats Indiana Jones for selecting the Holy Grail whereas Walter Donovan selected the False Grail.
DuckTales the Movie: Treasure of the Lost Lamp: As well as the utilizing the same font as the Indiana Jones films, promotional material – including one by Indiana Jones movie poster artist Drew Struzan – shows Scrooge McDuck sporting a fedora and carrying a rope over one shoulder similar to Jones and his bullwhip which does not occur in the feature itself.
Fanboys: While the plot of the movie concerns a group of Star Wars fans breaking into Skywalker Ranch to see a rough cut of Episode I in 1998, Indiana Jones items are seen and mentioned as being part of the ranch's prop collection. Lines from the movies are quoted and the three theatrical posters sit on the wall of George Lucas's office.
The Hangover: When his bag is dismissed as a purse, one character insists it is a satchel like Indiana Jones carries.
Howard the Duck: A duck-themed variation of Richard Amsel's Raiders of the Lost Ark movie poster can be seen on the titular Howard's wall named Breeders of the Lost Stork.
My Spy: JJ and Victor Marquez allude to Raiders of the Lost Ark as they engage in a fistfight near a moving plane in an airfield.
Paul: The titular alien can be seen giving Steven Spielberg movie tips out of Hangar 51 while Short Round is later mentioned near the close of the movie.
Spy Kids 2: The Island of Lost Dreams: OSS agent Carmen can be seen picking up the Chachapoyan Fertility Idol from a pile of gold.
Shrek 2: When Donkey gives accidentally the alarm to the assistants of the Fairy Godmother in the latter's dream factory, Shrek along with Donkey and Puss in Boots escape by a closing door, but Puss reaches under the door to retrieve his hat like Indy make in Indiana Jones and the Temple of Doom.
Starzan: Shouting Star of the Jungle: In this 1989 Filipino comedy film, there is a character named Indiana Jones.
Paddington: While escaping the hateful museum taxidermist Millicent Clyde, Paddington Bear reaches under a closing door to retrieve his hat.
Regal Academy – LingLing IronFan is being chased by the Rose Cinderella when it rolls.
The Rugrats Movie - The opening scene is a parody of many of the events in Raiders of the Lost Ark.
Transformers: Revenge of the Fallen: The Marshall College statue of Marcus Brody greets Sam Witwicky (played by Shia LaBeouf, voicing Louis Stevens from Even Stevens) when he and his family arrive at college.
UHF: The opening scenes parody the Temple scenes with "Weird Al" Yankovic attempting to swipe an Oscar statue from the temple, and then is chased by a boulder through various locations.
VeggieTales — Minnesota Cuke: The two films parody two of the four Indiana Jones films.
The short films Tadeo Jones, Tadeo Jones and the Basement of Doom and the features Tad, The Lost Explorer and Tad the Lost Explorer and the Secret of King Midas are parodies of the Indiana Jones franchise.
The Incredibles — Mr. Incredible is being chased by the Omnidroid when it rolls.
Home Alone – Harry gets his hand burned by the hot door knob.
 Red Notice - when Dwayne Johnson's character is searching the Nazi bunker the crate from Raiders of the Lost Ark is briefly visible by his torch showing the number 9906753.
Air Force One - President James Marshall punches the Russians since him and Indiana Jones are both played by the same actor.

Television
American Dad!: One scene from the series sees Stan Smith and his son parody the Map Room sequence, however their stand-in for the Headpiece to the Staff of Ra burns their paper map. Another scene has Smith and his alien companion Roger tied back to back like Indiana Jones and his father were. To get out of their predicament, Roger gets the idea to copy a scene he saw in a movie and simply kicks over a gas lamp to set the room on fire similar to what occurred at Castle Brunwald.
The Big Bang Theory:
"The Precious Fragmentation" has the main characters returning from a garage sale with a box of random television and movie collectibles. Included is an Indiana Jones connect-the-dots book.
"The 21-Second Excitation" has the characters watching Raiders of the Lost Ark on TV with Penny at the beginning of the episode and the plot involves them going to a screening of the film with 21 seconds of previously unseen footage. "The Raiders March" by John Williams is used twice, at the beginning and at the end when Sheldon Cooper steals the film reels and flees with the others as they are being chased by the audience waiting to see the film. Indiana Jones and the Temple of Doom is also directly referenced and Leonard Hofstadter is called Short Round.
Charlie Brooker's Gameswipe identifies Raiders of the Lost Ark as a documentary while discussing the World War II set Wolfenstein series.
The Chipmunks Go To The Movies had an entire episode dedicated to spoofing Raiders of the Lost Ark entitled Daytona Jones and the Pearl of Wisdom.
Chip 'n Dale Rescue Rangers: The show was originally pitched starring Kit Colby, "an Indiana Jones type of guy, complete with the leather jacket and the fluffy collar" before he was turned into Chip in the final version and given an Indiana Jones fedora on top of Colby's outfit.
Doctor Who character River Song is said to be inspired by Indiana Jones, being an adventurer with a doctorate in archaeology. Especially in the episode "The Pandorica Opens", a secret passage opening under Stonehenge mirrors various scenes in the films.
Doctor Who Confidential:
In "Call Me the Doctor", actor Matt Smith reveals that part of the costume of his character, the (Eleventh) Doctor, was inspired by the Indiana Jones' Barnett College teaching attire.
"When Time Froze" reveals that the script for the episode "The Wedding of River Song" contains the action "The Doctor walks through an Indiana Jones tunnel".
EastEnders: The episode broadcast on 27 December 2011 has a character in hospital remarking that "This sort of thing never happened to Indiana Jones." The 19 June 2012 edition depicted a family watching an undisclosed film which had "The Raiders March" playing over it.
The Fairly OddParents: "The Big Bash" — Timmy (dressed like Indy), Cosmo, and Wanda search for Peruvian coffee beans in a temple, much like in the opening scene from Raiders of the Lost Ark.
Family Guy:
"A Fistful of Meg" — Meg defeats the bully, Michael Pulaski by exposing her grotesque body which causes his face to melt off being a reference to Toht's death in Raiders of the Lost Ark
"Fifteen Minutes of Shame" — Peter and Meg Griffin paraphrase Indiana Jones and Lao Che's exchange about the antidote to the poison.
"Stuck Together, Torn Apart" — A parody of Raiders of the Ark'''s Map Room scene occurs when Peter Griffin affixes the Headpiece to the Staff of Ra to a stick in the attic and uses the window to create the beam of light.
"When You Wish Upon a Weinstein" — The episode includes a cutaway to a parody of Indiana Jones trying to claim the golden idol.
"Blind Ambition" — Peter Griffin's fight with a giant chicken climaxes on an airport and the pair brawl around the Flying Wing.
"Peter's Got Woods" — The episode includes a crate being stored at Hangar 51.
"Jungle Love" — Peter, Lois and Chris Griffin with Jock Lindsey escape from angered villagers the same way as Indiana Jones fleeing the Hovitos. The sequence keeps the music intact, and Meg Griffin is left behind to suffer a death like Barranca.
"The Courtship of Stewie's Father" — Rescuing child slaves from a Disney World attraction involves Peter and Stewie Griffin reenacting the Temple of Doom minecart sequence, including Michael Eisner trying to take Peter's heart like Mola Ram.
"Stewie B. Goode" — Stewie Griffin, as Short Round, recalls being in India with Indiana Jones and Willie Scott. When Scott starts screaming as the Temple of Doom roof spikes close in, Griffin makes an aside that she's only there because she's sleeping with the director.
"Road to Germany" — A sequence in which Brian and Stewie Griffin, and Mort Goldman exit their crashing plane mimics the same situation from Indiana Jones and the Temple of Doom complete with raft, "We're not sinking, we're crashing!" quote and Slalom on Mt. Humol from the movie's score.
"Hannah Banana" — A spoof of the "Love you" student occurs when Chris and Peter are feuding at the breakfast table. Chris closes his eyes to reveal the words "Hate You" written on his eyelids.Fanboy & Chum Chum: Season 2, Episode 24; "Microphonies" Fanboy receives a box with a microphone in the mail. As he opens it, he reaches into the box by making a hole, and says "Kali Ma......". Chum Chum then follows and says "Omnomshiba, Omnomshiba".FlashForward: In "Revelation Zero Part 1", FBI agent Mark Benson visits a therapist who has several Mighty Muggs figures from various franchises on her windowsill. The Arab Swordsman is amongst them.Friends: "The One with the Cooking Class" — A store clerk flirting with Ross Geller claims that, as a paleontologist who works out, he is like Indiana Jones. Ross agrees, and later likens himself to Jones again prior to his date with the clerk, telling her that he'll grab his whip.Futurama: The episode "Anthology of Interest II" contains a story entitled Raiders of the Lost Arcade.Hercules: The Legendary Journeys: In the Season 4 premiere, "Beanstalks and Bad Eggs", Hercules (Kevin Sorbo) and Autolycus (Bruce Campbell) break into the booby-trapped home of a warlord to steal a pouch. The whole scene is an homage to the opening of Raiders, with Hercules playing the Satipo role (Sorbo even mimicks Alfred Molina's greedy hand gestures) and Autolycus filling in for Indy.I Want My Own Room: "Bird Hide" sees a buried item that looks like it could be a Second World War bomb, prompting one of the hosts to claim they need a hero. This cues "The Raiders March", and when the "bomb" is discovered to simply be a bottle, the graphic "Indiana Elliot and the Bottle of Doom" appears on-screen.The Inbetweeners: "Thorpe Park" — Will McKenzie states that he once waited three hours to go on the "Indiana Jones ride at Disneyland Paris".Indiana Jones: The True Story: As well as using the Indiana Jones name for the title, the documentary on Roy Chapman Andrews also includes clips from the Indiana Jones movies.The Lone Gunmen: Someone speculates who would win in a match between Indiana Jones and Han Solo.Lost: Of Sawyer's nicknames for Walt Lloyd, Short Round is included in the first season's eighteenth episode.Magnum, P.I.: "Legend of the Lost Art" is a parody of Raiders as well as a reference to Tom Selleck being selected for the Indiana Jones role before it was prevented by his commitments to do Magnum, P.I.Midsomer Murders: The observer of a fight between an archaeologist's son and another man comments that it is "better than Indiana Jones".Mickey Mouse Club House:  In season 4 episode 2 titled "Quest for the Crystal Mickey!" Mickey Mouse dresses as Indiana Jones and calls himself Kansas City Mickey in reference to Indy's name, the whole episode then follows themes from the Indiana Jones movie series".Mongrels: The show's documentary opens with "The Map Room: Dawn" playing. Also in the series pilot, neutered cat Marion attempts to lower himself into a veterinary hospital to retrieve his testicles, observing that the situation reminds him of Indiana Jones. The camera cuts to a tank of snakes below and Marion's companion asks if he means Raiders of the Lost Ark but the cat points out that he was actually referring to the latest movie, which he saw as "a massive pile of bollocks" and the camera shows various animal testicles gathered in a heap.Muppet Babies opening sequence included a parody of animated Baby Kermit, in Indy's gear, swinging away from a film clip of the boulder trap in the Temple of the Chachapoyan Warriors from Raiders of the Lost Ark.MythBusters contains many famous experiments about the franchise.My Little Pony: Friendship is Magic There are several allusions to the Indiana Jones franchise in the episode "Read It and Weep": The harp plucking that plays when Daring Do first enters the temple bears a strong resemblance to the music that plays in the opening of Raiders of the Lost Ark, when Indiana Jones casually brushes spiders off of his back. The sunlight shining into the chamber is a reference to the map room scene from Raiders of the Lost Ark, where the sunlight shines on a crystal at the center of the room. The way Daring Do makes her way to the Sapphire Stone's pedestal mirrors a scene from Indiana Jones and the Last Crusade, where the titular hero navigates a trap floor by only stepping on the correct tiles. The scene where Daring Do retrieves the Sapphire Stone mirrors a scene from Raiders of the Lost Ark, in which Indiana Jones retrieves an idol statue from a pedestal. Also, one episode is called "Crusaders of the Lost Mark", a reference to Raiders of the Lost Ark.One Foot in the Grave: During the sitcom's 1995 Christmas special, "The Wisdom of the Witch", main character Victor Meldrew complains to his wife that their malfunctioning television set sounds like Indiana Jones is inside cracking his whip.The One Show: The magazine program included a segment called Raider of the Lost Archive featuring a parody of the boulder chase in the title sequence with reporter Gyles Brandreth dressed as Indiana Jones managing to escape through a closing door with a film reel in hand. The title also uses the same font as Raiders of the Lost Ark.Outnumbered: The third episode of the fourth series features an argument between father and son Pete and Jake Brockman about whether the game of Subbuteo they're playing is a more realistic recreation of an actual association football match compared to the FIFA video game series. Seeing the size of the ball next to the players for the first time, Jake exclaims that "It's like the ball that chases Indiana Jones".Phineas and Ferb: The episode "Phineas and Ferb and the Temple of Juatchadoon" depicts the show's characters in an Indiana Jones parody. After locating and retrieving the Amulet of Juatchdoon, adventuring archeologist duo Ohio Flynn (Phineas) and Rhode Island Fletcher (Ferb) set off to Central America to help Isabella find the Lost Temple of Juatchadoon and her missing mother. However, Dr. Doofenshmirtz has other plans for the amulet – to awaken the evil corn colossus to give him the power to destroy the world.QI: "Series E" of the quiz show featured an episode focused on exploration in which a contestant's buzzer noise was "The Raiders March". The boulder scene was mentioned as part of a clue to the cleaning method of Paris's sewers. "Series F"'s episode on film also utilised the theme as a buzzer. The franchise was referenced for a second time in the same episode with a question concerning the Wilhelm scream, and sound producer Ben Burtt mentioned.LoliRock When Auriana is trying to outrun the Iris, he is parodying the famous boulder scene in Raiders of the Lost Ark.Quantum Leap:
"A Portrait for Troian" sees Sam Beckett, in the body of Dr. Timothy Mintz, rescue Troian Claridge from her collapsing family crypt. She calls out to him as Tim but when rescued she reverts to calling him Dr. Mintz prompting Sam to ask "Will I have to play Indiana Jones again to get you to call me by my first name?"
"Another Mother" depicts Kevin Bruckner lying about his reasons for leaving the house by claiming that he and his friends are going to see Raiders again. He also mentions that if he doesn't leave, he's going to miss "the rock rolling out of the cave".Regular Show: Season 3, Episode 57; "Eggscellent" Mordecai tries to win a hat for Rigby who is in coma. He is sent into an underground chamber with hats, and only one of them is a true hat. There is a knight down there who is dressed quite similarly to the Grail Knight, and tells him he'd die if he chose the wrong one. He chooses the most generic-looking hat.Robot Chicken: "Metal Militia" contains a segment called "Young Indy" in which a young Indiana Jones finds adventure on the playground at elementary school, recreating different scenes from Raiders of the Lost Ark, with a boy in a large plastic bubble playing the role of the Chachapoyan boulder trap, and the teacher taking the Staff of Ra.Robot Chicken: "Robot Chicken: Star Wars Episode II" contains a segment called "Palpatine's Trip", which parodied scenes from Return of the Jedi, including Emperor Palpatine referring to the Force pike used by the Imperial royal guard as a Staff of Ra.Robot Chicken: "Due to Constraints of Time and Budget": segment "Don't Open Your Eyes" has the spirits of the Ark of the Covenant attempting to get Indiana Jones and Marion Ravenwood to open their eyes in the Raiders climax.Scrubs:
"My Quarantine" has Doctor John "JD" Dorian imagining his colleague's wife as escaping the quarantine lockdown being put into effect like Indiana Jones does when evading the spike trap in Temple of Doom. She rolls under the descending wall and her hand reaches back in quickly to grab her hat before it closes.
"My Missed Perception" includes JD picturing his surgeon friend performing exploratory surgery as Indiana Jones. The sequence parodies the escape from the Chachapoyan temple with the removal of a "golden tumor" and the surgeon lamenting "Colon? Why did it have to be colon?" when he enters.Seinfeld: "The Parking Space" has the cast calling George Costanza "Indiana" when he is wearing a fedora.The Simpsons:
"Bart's Friend Falls in Love", Bart Simpson re-enacts the prologue from Raiders of the Lost Ark. Instead of acquiring the golden idol, Bart tries to get his father's coin jar.
"Little Orphan Millie" includes the character of Milhouse's uncle, Norbert Van Houten, who dresses like Indiana Jones and flies a biplane. A cue from "The Raiders March" is also played.
"How Munched is That Birdie in the Window" references Indiana Jones' ophidiophobia as an example of how "everyone has an animal they can't stand".
There is a home media collection of episodes entitled Raiders of the Lost Fridge, whose cover art features Homer fleeing a giant rolling donut in Indiana Jones attire.South Park:
"Free Hat", the four main characters try to stop George Lucas and Steven Spielberg from re-editing Raiders of the Lost Ark, adding Ewoks. The movie premiere of the special edition of Raiders has Spielberg dress up like Belloq at the Ark opening scene.
"Meet the Jeffersons": The Ark of the Covenant lies among the wealthy Mr. Jefferson's possessions within his son's bedroom.
"The China Probrem": The characters react to the release of Indiana Jones and the Kingdom of the Crystal Skull and believe that Indiana Jones was literally raped by his creators.
"200": George Lucas and Steven Spielberg are among the celebrities looking for revenge for being made fun of by the titular town. With them is Indiana Jones wearing a leash and ballgag.Total Drama: Revenge of the Island features Mike, a teen with multiple personalities. One of his personalities is an adventurous treasure hunter called Manitoba Smith, who is a direct parody of Indiana Jones, from their first names being locations, to the fedora both characters wear.Stargate SG-1: The episode "Moebius, Part 1" sees archaeologist Daniel Jackson approached at a funeral by the niece of the deceased. She explains that her aunt always talked about him, admitting that she had "always used to picture some Indiana Jones type."That Mitchell and Webb Look: One sketch sees a man counter his soccer enthusiast companion's gloating as if he had personally been in the game by speaking of Indiana Jones's role in Raiders in the first person, asking if the man remembered when his 'team' found the Ark of the Covenant.That Mitchell and Webb Look: In a sketch from the fourth episode of the fourth series, a mention of Iraq is said to most likely bring up images of "Indiana Jones type fellas on the news."The Thick of It: In the fourth episode of the third season, Department of Social Affairs and Citizenship's Director of Communication, Malcolm Tucker, adopts the franchises' naming convention in commending Nicola Murray's enthusiasm to go after her political opposite, quickly dubbing it Indiana Murray and the Bum-d***o of Vengeance.The Thick of It: Season four, episode five — "The Ark has been opened and your face is gonna melt."Tiny Toon Adventures: The episode "Cinemaniacs!" has a sequence dedicated to parodying elements from Indiana Jones entitled 'Pasadena Jones and the Secret of Life'. It includes Buster Bunny as Pasadena literally riding the red line used in the movies on maps to show Jones traveling to his location, fleeing a giant rolling 8-ball and riding a minecart.The Walking Dead: The first episode of season two has racist Daryl Dixon calling Asian-American Glenn (who favors wearing a baseball cap) Short Round.Warehouse 13: An episode pays homage to the opening scenes of Indiana Jones and the Kingdom of the Crystal Skull in which the approach to a top secret facility in the desert finds the military being greeted by a man stepping out of a car in Jones's attire.World Wrestling Entertainment: As part of the company's promotion for their Summerslam pay-per-view event in 2008, wrestler Chris Jericho parodied Raiders' idol and sandbag scene.The OfficeSeason 2, Episode 21"Conflict Resolution" Toby files the box of Dwight's complaints about Jim in the warehouse and the camera zooms out to reveal entire shelves full of similar boxes, a reference to the ending sequence where the Ark of the Covenant is stored in Hangar 51.
Season 3, Episode 5 "Diwali" Angela discourages Kevin from attending Kelly's Diwali celebration claiming "they eat monkey brains" a reference to Indiana Jones and the Temple of Doom specifically, the sequence which the main characters attend dinner at Pankot palace and eat "Chilled Monkey Brains".Batman Beyond: The episode "Spellbound" has a sequence where Chelsea Cunningham is bewitched by Ira Billings/Spellbinder, and in her fantasies she appears as a scantily-clad adventurer who enters into a jungle temple to retrieve a stone statue (which is in reality a statue of Mr. Cunningham's study), mirroring the iconic opening sequence from Raiders of the Lost Ark.Arrow: The episode "Legends of Yesterday" Cisco Ramon likens two gems made of an element which glows in proximity to other objects of the same material to the Sankara Stones from Indiana Jones and the Temple of Doom.Arrow: The episode "Thanatos Guild" – When she finds out that a building hiding a map is booby-trapped, Felicity Smoak/Overwatch asks if the traps are of the Raiders or Temple of Doom variety. Thea Queen/Speedy eventually points out that they are more like Raiders and triggers a trap which shoots out arrows.

ComicsAll-Star Squadron #5 "Never Step on a Feathered Serpent" by Roy Thomas, Rich Buckler, Jerry Ordway, and Adrian Gonzales, January 1982, has a reference to Hitler's quests for various artifacts of power, including his failed attempt to acquire the Ark of the Covenant.All-Star Squadron #6, "Mayhem in the Mile-High City", a fellow archaeologist (who is also the madman villain) clearly mentions Prof. Indiana Jones as a contemporary.Captain America #268 (1982), from Marvel Comics advertises and features freelance artist Steve Rogers and his girlfriend Bernie Rosenthal emerging from a Brooklyn Movie Theater, discussing the impact of Indiana Jones and Raiders of the Lost Ark.Fantastic Four #241 (1982) sees Ben "The Thing" Grimm dressing as Indiana Jones as a joke for his traveling to Africa. He gets called "Idaho Smith" by the Human Torch, asked if he expects to find the Ark of the Covenant by Mr. Fantastic while his wife, the Invisible Woman, mentions that the movie is one even Mr. Fantastic had seen.
Dr. Slump: A vehicle has the designation of OB-CPO. One of the manga chapter covers features the titular character Senbei "Dr. Slump" Norimaki dressed as Indiana Jones, fleeing a giant rolling pumpkin. The penultimate chapter cover features Norimaki as Jones again, this time with his wife Midori as Willie Scott and Arale Norimaki as Short Round.The Uncanny X-Men #268 (1990) partly set in 1941, depicts the first meeting of Wolverine, dressed in Indiana Jones' attire, with Captain America. Together, the two face off against Nazis.Spider-Man: The Other references Raiders and uses Jones's "It's not the years, it's the mileage" quote as part of an explanation of Peter Parker's rejuvenated health.Marvel Civil War: Peter Parker/Spider-Man recalls that he and his aunt missed the first ten minutes of Raiders.Siege: New Avengers: When Spider-Man is attacked by a brainwashed Spider-Woman, he laments that Short Round is not present with a torch to break her free.
War of the Green Lanterns: After Hal Jordan stops Guy Gardner from taking a gauntlet from its case, Gardner calls Jordan "Indy" and asks if he is scared that removing the gauntlet will cause a boulder to fall.

Literature
Terry Pratchett's 1992 novel Only You Can Save Mankind contains several references to films and games about the adventurer "Alabama Smith". The Discworld novel Reaper Man mentions "the Lost Jewelled Temple of Doom of Offler the Crocodile God", as well as a "chap with a whip" who tried to steal from it, and several traps reminiscent of the opening sequence of Raiders of the Lost Ark.Danger Guys, a 1994 children's book by Tony Abbott in which two boys find an underground temple, and are chased by a huge stone.The Green Hornet: Still at Large: The Bantu Wind and Simon Katanga make cameo appearances in Richard Dean Starr's novelette, "The World Will End in Fire". The Bantu Wind serves as Hayashi Kato's transportation to China.Sandstorm, a 2004 adventure thriller, by James Rollins includes an archaeologist named Omaha Dunn, who is sometimes compared to Indiana Jones, both having place names as first names and working in the field of archaeology and artifact retrieval. Rollins later wrote the novelization of Indiana Jones and the Kingdom of the Crystal Skull.

Video gamesBomberman GB: Bomberman adopts Jones's attire and whip for the game.
 Broforce: Features a playable character called Indiana Brones and on the PC version, has an achievement called “No Ticket!”, which is a joke on a line from Indiana Jones and the Last Crusade. Borderlands: For applying an elemental artifact, players unlock the trophy/achievement "You call this archaeology?", a quote by Henry Walton Jones, Senior.Borderlands 3: The game features a side mission called "Raiders of the Lost Rock" in which players must follow a trail of stolen rocks, collect "brownrocks" off of booby-trapped pedestals, and collect "Abigail" among other things.Call of Duty: Black Ops: The multiplayer map "Nuketown" is directly inspired by the Doom Town testing site from Indiana Jones and the Kingdom of the Crystal Skull, complete with mannequins, and an atomic bomb suspended in a cradle.Castlevania: Portrait of Ruin: The game features an equippable fedora, which is described as feeling "right with a whip". It is found in an Egyptian tomb, at a point where the leather whip is one of the better weapons.Civilization Revolution: Collecting an ancient artifact will award Xbox 360 players with the achievement "Good Afternoon, Doctor Jones.", a quote by Belloq, and is displayed with an image of the Ark of the Covenant.E.T. the Extra-Terrestrial: As an easter egg, Indiana Jones appears after certain conditions in the game are met.Fallout: New Vegas: The game includes a battered refrigerator containing a skeleton, along with a fedora identified as a "Suave Gambler's Hat". One computer terminal sees an email outboxed to Marcus Brody.Gex: The first game of the series features geckos dressed in Jones' traditional outfit as enemies in a world named "Jungle Isle".Golden Sun: As the player explores the Altin Mines, they will have to knock down a log, triggering a trap and causing the player to be chased by a giant boulder.QuackShot: As well as the game adopting the Indiana Jones font for the in-game title, Donald Duck's treasure hunting sees him adopting a fedora for his adventure.RuneScape: Henry Jones Sr. can be seen in the MMO game's school near the Barbarian Village, as "Professor Henry".Toy Soldiers: Cold War: The description for an unlockable avatar award, a flight jacket, paraphrases Major Eaton's "top men" line.Transformice: There is a title and character called "Indiana Mouse".VeggieTales: Minnesota Cuke and the Coconut Apes borrows heavily from the Indiana Jones character.World of Warcraft: An archaeologist non-player character named Harrison Jones — a portmanteau of Harrison Ford and Indiana Jones — paraphrases some of Indiana Jones's Barnett College lecture from Indiana Jones and the Last Crusade. The World of Warcraft Jones also has a counterpart named Belloc, a heterograph of Belloq, who wears similar attire to Indiana's rival.WWE All Stars: Triple H mentions there are top men working on a match for himself and partner Shawn Michaels' opponents. Michaels asks who and simply gets a firm, repeated "Top... Men..."Professor Layton and the Curious Village: In one scene Layton and Luke escaping from Ferris wheel making reference to the Giant Rock.Taz: Wanted: The level "Cartoon Strip-Mine", Taz is dressed as Indiana Jones' traditional outfit. Also, Taz's line "Snakes. Why'd it have to be Snakes? Taz hate snakes" is from Indiana Jones in Raiders of the Lost Ark''.

References
This article is partially or entirely from the site of Indiana Jones Wiki, the text has been placed by the author or person responsible for publication under the  Creative Commons Attribution-ShareAlike License or a compatible license. (See the list of authors.)

Indiana Jones
Parodies of films